Ceremony is a 2010 American film directed by Max Winkler, in his feature film directorial debut. The film stars Michael Angarano, Uma Thurman, Lee Pace, Rebecca Mader and Reece Thompson. It premiered at the Toronto International Film Festival in September 2010. The film was released on VOD on March 4, 2011, and opened in theaters April 8, 2011.

Plot
Sam Davis (Michael Angarano) convinces his former best friend to spend a weekend with him to rekindle their friendship at an elegant beachside estate owned by a famous documentary filmmaker (Lee Pace). It soon becomes clear that Sam is secretly infatuated with the filmmaker's fiancée, Zoe (Uma Thurman), and that his true intention is to thwart their impending nuptials. As Sam's plan begins to unravel, he is forced to realize how complicated love and friendship can be.

Cast
 Michael Angarano as Sam Davis
 Uma Thurman as Zoe
 Reece Thompson as Marshall Schmidt
 Lee Pace as Whit Coutell
 Jake Johnson as Teddy
 Rebecca Mader as Esme Ball

Reception
, Ceremony holds a 39% approval rating on Rotten Tomatoes, based on 36 reviews with an average rating of 4.86/10.

References

External links
 
 
 

2010 romantic comedy films
2010 films
American romantic comedy films
2010 directorial debut films
Films produced by Polly Cohen Johnsen
Films directed by Max Winkler
2010s English-language films
2010s American films